Come is the fifteenth studio album by American recording artist Prince. It was released on August 16, 1994 by Warner Bros. Records. At the time of its release, Prince was in a public dispute with his then-record company, Warner Bros.

The album would be Prince's final Warner Bros. album under his name. For the remainder of his contract with the company, his name would be represented by the "Love Symbol", and he would be referred to as "The Artist Formerly Known as Prince".

Evolution of the album
Most of the songs from the Come album were recorded in early 1993 during a highly prolific time for Prince. An early collection of single word-titled tracks included: "Come", "Endorphinmachine", "Space", "Pheromone", "Loose!", "Papa", "Dark", and "Poem". It was unknown at this time if these tracks were indeed intended for an album. In late May 1993, Prince's then band member, Mayte Garcia, sent a letter to a Prince fanzine listing the above tracks, plus a few others: "Interactive", "Peach", "Pope", "Solo", and "Race". Most of these songs were newly written, except "Peach" (written in 1992), and "Race" (written in 1991 during the Love Symbol Album sessions—it uses a scratching sound effect similar to Love Symbol Albums "The Continental").

After Prince's name change to an unpronounceable symbol, he intended to release new songs under that moniker in formats other than albums. He would fulfill his contract to Warner Bros. by delivering unreleased material from his music vault. Prince conceived an "interactive musical experience" called Glam Slam Ulysses—a musical loosely based on Homer's Odyssey. Thirteen tracks were selected and premiered as the first new material from Prince. These songs and many others would travel back and forth between different concepts of albums in a relatively short frame of time. The Dawn was a triple-album concept. The track listing is unknown, but the idea was scrapped for single album releases. Some of these ended up on Come, and some on a new album called The Gold Experience. There was also an idea floating around for The Beautiful Experience that took on various forms before its final release as a maxi single.

On March 6, 1994, Prince submitted a tape of eight songs to Dutch radio stations which included the song "Pheromone". Five days later, he submitted the first version of the Come album to Warner Bros. The album consisted of: "Poem", "Interactive", "Endorphinemachine", "Space", "Pheromone", "Loose!", "Papa", "Race", "Dark", "Solo", and "Strays of the World". This version of the album is exactly 45 minutes in length, has been leaked, and is known as the Come Test Pressing. The title track was absent. Warner Bros. rejected this version, and asked for the title track along with some other new material, such as the recent hit "The Most Beautiful Girl in the World". Prince went back into the studio and tooled with the title track, creating an 11-minute horn-boosted sexual romp. He added it to the album and resubmitted it to Warner Bros., and they agreed to it.

Prince changed the album once again, removing the more rock-oriented tracks "Interactive", "Endorphinemachine", and "Strays of the World". He broke up "Poem" into segues throughout the album, with the remainder retitled as "Orgasm", and also included the newly written track "Letitgo". This final version was submitted to Warner Bros. on the same day as a configuration of The Gold Experience. Prince wanted them to release both albums simultaneously, so the Prince material would compete with the one released under the symbolic moniker in the charts (with the latter having more commercial material). Warner Bros. accepted both albums, but refused to release them both at the same time fearing the market would have too much Prince material in stock.

The guitar sound on "Orgasm" is a sample of a feedback guitar solo from a previous Prince track, "Private Joy" from his 1981 album Controversy. The moaning on "Orgasm" is that of Vanity, recorded in 1983 for the unreleased track "Vibrator". In the liner notes, Vanity is credited as "she knows".

Upon release, Come received little support from Prince, who derided the album as "old material", despite the fact that many of the tracks had been recorded during the same sessions that produced The Gold Experience. Since Prince placed the more up-tempo and commercial material from these sessions on The Gold Experience, the overall tone of Come is somewhat dark and experimental in nature. Despite Prince's apparent marketing neglect, Come performed moderately well, reaching number 15 in the United States, going gold and receiving heavy R&B airplay with the single "Letitgo". In the United Kingdom, the album was a huge hit, debuting at number 1. Prince also released two maxi singles in support of the album.

In 1993, a funkier instrumental version of the song "Pheromone" was used as the theme music for the BET music video program, Video LP.

The album cover proclaims "Prince: 1958–1993", indicating that Prince had "died" in 1993, and was reborn under his Love Symbol alias. The church depicted in the background of the record's cover is the Sagrada Família in Barcelona. The outtakes from the photoshoot for the cover of the album were released a year before in The Sacrifice of Victor, Prince's first book.

Track listing
All songs written by Prince, except "Solo", music composed by Prince and lyrics written by David Henry Hwang.

Promotional vinyl bonus tracks:
 "Space" (Universal Love Remix) – 6:10 (singing different lyrics than the album track)
 "Space" (Funky Stuff Remix) – 5:42
 "Letitgo" (QDIII Instrumental Mix) – 5:00 (retitled "Instrumental" for single release)
 "Letitgo" (J-Sw!ft #3 Instrumental) – 5:43 (retitled "(-) Sherm Stick Edit" for single release)

Personnel
 Prince – lead vocals and various instruments
 Tommy Barbarella – keyboards (2, 7)
 Mr. Hayes – keyboards (2, 7)
 Sonny T. – bass (2, 5, 7)
 Michael B. – drums (2, 5, 7)
 Brian Gallagher – tenor saxophone (1, 6, 7, 9)
 Kathy J. – baritone saxophone (1, 6, 7, 9)
 Joseph Robinson – trumpet (1, 6, 7, 9)
 Steve Strand – trumpet (1, 6, 7, 9)
 Dave Jensen – trumpet (1, 6, 7, 9)
 Michael B. Nelson – trombone (1, 6, 7, 9)
 Ricky Peterson – keyboards (9)
 Eric Leeds – flute (9)
 Mayte – backing vocals (6)
 Kathleen Bradford – backing vocals (9)
 Jearlyn Steele Battle – "Face the music" looped sample (6)
 Vanity – vocalizations (10)

Singles and Hot 100 chart placings
 "Letitgo" (#31 US, #10 US R&B)
 "Space" (#71 US R&B)

Charts

Weekly charts

Year-end charts

Certifications

References

External links
 Come at Discogs

1994 albums
Prince (musician) albums
Albums produced by Prince (musician)
Warner Records albums